Mastax philippina is a species of beetle in the family Carabidae with restricted distribution in the Philippines.

References

Mastax philippina
Beetles of Asia
Beetles described in 1935